This is a list of kingdoms in pre-colonial Africa, which existed before the Scramble for Africa when most of the continent came under the control of European powers. 

Some kingdoms, such as the Kingdom of Ardra in Benin, Buganda in Uganda, or the Kingdom of Bailundo in Angola, still exist today as non-sovereign monarchies, with varying legal and constitutional statuses within their respective countries.

Comparison
Historian Jan Vansina (1962) discusses the classification of Sub-Saharan African Kingdoms, mostly of Central, South and East Africa, with some additional data on West African (Sahelian) Kingdoms distinguishing five types, by decreasing centralization of power:
Despotic Kingdoms: Kingdoms where the king controls the internal and external affairs directly. Examples are Rwanda, Ankole, Busoga and the Kingdom of Kongo in the 16th century.
Regal Kingdoms: Kingdoms where the king controls the external affairs directly, and the internal affairs via a system of overseers. The king and his chiefs belong to the same religion or group.
Incorporative Kingdoms: Kingdoms where the king only controls the external affairs with no permanent administrative links between him and the chiefs of the provinces. The hereditary chiefdoms of the provinces were left undisturbed after conquest. Examples are the Bamileke, Lunda, Luba and Lozi
Aristocratic Kingdoms: the only link between central authority and the provinces is payment of tribute. These kingdoms are morphologically intermediate between regal kingdoms and federations. This type is rather common in Africa, examples including the Kongo of the 17th century, the Cazembe, Luapula, Kuba, Ngonde, Mlanje, Ha, Zinza and Chagga states of the 18th century.
Federations such as the Ashanti Union. Kingdoms where the external affairs are regulated by a council of elders headed by the king, who is simply primus inter pares.

The Islamic empires of North and Northeast Africa do not fall into this categorization and should be discussed as part of the Muslim world.

History periods
Ancient history (3600 BC–500 AD)

Ancient history refers to the time period beginning with the first records in writing, approximately 3600 BC. It ends with the fall of several significant empires, such as the Western Roman Empire in the Mediterranean, the Han Dynasty in China, and the Gupta Empire in India, collectively around 500 AD.

Postclassical Era (500–1500 AD)

The Postclassical Era, also referred to as the Medieval period or, for Europe, the Middle Ages, begins around 500 AD after the fall of major civilizations, covering the advent of Islam. The period ends around 1450–1500, with events like the rise of moveable-type printing in Europe, the voyages of Christopher Columbus, and the Ottoman Empire's conquest of Constantinople.

Modern history (1500–present )

The Modern Period covers human history from the creation of a more global network (i.e. contact between the Americas and Europeans) to present day.

List of African kingdoms
Non-exhaustive list of known pre-colonial kingdoms and empires on the African continent.

North Africa

Ancient

Old Kingdom of Egypt (2686-2181 BCE)
Kingdom of Kerma (2500–1500 BCE)
Middle Kingdom of Egypt (2040-1650 BCE)
New Kingdom of Egypt (1550-1077 BCE)
Kingdom of Kush (1070 BCE–350 CE)
Late Dynastic Egypt (664-525 BCE, 404-343 BCE)
Carthaginian Empire (650–146 BCE)
Kingdom of Blemmyes (600 BCE–3rd c. CE)
Ptolemaic Kingdom (306–30 BCE)
Kingdom of Mauretania (285 BCE–431 CE and again (533–698 CE)
Kingdom of Numidia (202–46 BCE)
Kingdom of Makuria (340–1317 CE)
Kingdom of Nobatia (350–650 CE)
Kingdom of the Vandals and Alans (435–534 CE)

Post-classical
Kingdom of Alodia (7th c.–1504 CE)
Kingdom of Nekor (710–1019 CE)
Barghawata Confederacy (744–1058 CE)
Emirate of Sijilmassa (758–1055 CE)
Rustamid imamate (Algeria, 767–909 CE)
Idrisid dynasty (Morocco, 789–974 CE)
Aghlabids (Tunisia, 800-909) 
Fatimid Caliphate (910–1171)
Hammadid dynasty (Algeria, 1014–1152 CE)
Zirid dynasty (Algeria, 1048–1148 CE)
Almoravid dynasty (Morocco, 1040–1147 CE)
Khurasanid dynasty (1059–1128 & 1148–1158 CE)
Almohad dynasty (Morocco, 1121–1269 CE)
Ayyubid dynasty (Egypt, 1171–1254 CE)
Hafsid dynasty (Tunisia, 1229–1574 CE)
Kingdom of Tlemcen (Algeria, 1235–1556 CE)
Marinid dynasty (Morocco, 1248–1465 CE)
Mamluk Sultanate (Egypt, 1250–1517 CE)
Wattasid dynasty (Morocco, 1420–1554 CE)

Modern
Sultanate of Sennar (1504–1821 CE)
Saadi principality of Sus and Tagmadert (1509–1554 CE)
Saadi dynasty (Morocco, 1554–1659 CE)
Naqsid principality of Tetouan (1597–1673 CE)
Sultanate of Darfur (1603–1874 & 1898–1916 CE)
Republic of Bou Regreg (1627–1668 CE)
Alaouite dynasty (Morocco, 1666–current CE)
Muhammad Ali dynasty (Egypt, 1914–1951 CE)
Senussi dynasty (Libya, 1951–1969 CE)

East Africa

Ancient
Kingdom of Punt (2400–1069 BCE)
Kingdom of Dʿmt (c. 980–400 BCE)
Aksumite Empire (50–937 CE)
Swahili Coast (50 CE–)
Barbara/Barbaroi city states (1000 BCE – 5th century CE)
Macrobian Kingdom (1000 BCE – 500 BCE)

Post-classical
Harla Kingdom (501-? CE)
Kingdom of Bazin (9th century CE)
Kingdom of Semien (325-1627 CE)
Kingdom of Belgin (9th century CE)
Kingdom of Jarin (9th century CE)
Kingdom of Qita'a (9th century CE)
Kingdom of Nagash (9th century CE)
Kingdom of Tankish (9th century CE)
Tunni Sultanate (9th century - 13th century))
Sultanate of Showa (896-1286 CE)
 Chwezi Empire (940 CE - 1500 CE)
Kilwa Sultanate (960–1513 CE)
Kingdom of Medri Bahri (1137–1890 CE)
Ethiopian Empire (1137–1974 CE)
Zagwe dynasty (1137–1270 CE)
Solomonic dynasty (1270–1974 CE)
Sultanate of Ifat (1285–1415 CE)
Hadiya Sultanate (13th century-15th century CE)
Sultanate of Mogadishu (13th century–16th century CE)
Kingdom of Buganda (1500 CE – present)
Kingdom of Bunyoro (1500 CE–present)
Ajuran Sultanate (14th century–17th century CE)
Kingdom of Kaffa (1390-1897)
Kingdom of Rwanda (1500 CE – 1959 CE)
Adal Sultanate (1415–1555 CE)
Shilluk Kingdom (1490-present CE)
Ankole Kingdom (1500 CE - 1967 CE)

Modern
Buganda Kingdom (15th Century- present)
Sennar Sultanate (1502–1821 CE) 
Kingdom of Burundi (1680–1966 CE)
Kingdom of Kooki (1720-1896 CE)
Sultanate of the Geledi (late 17th century–late 19th century CE)
Sultanate of Aussa (fl. 1734–present CE)
Majeerteen Sultanate (mid-18th century–early 20th century CE)
Isaaq Sultanate (mid 18th century-late 19th century CE)
Habr Yunis Sultanate (late 18th century-1907 CE)
Kingdom of Gomma (early 19th century–1886 CE)
Tooro Kingdom (1830-present CE)
Mbokane Chieftaincy (pre–1745)
Kingdom of Jimma (1830–1932 CE)
Kingdom of Gumma (1840–1902 CE)
Sultanate of Hobyo (1880s–1920s CE)
Kingdom of Karagwe (19th century-1916 CE)
Kingdom of Unyanyembe (19th century)
Kingdom of Urambo

West Africa

Ancient
Kintampo Complex (2500-1400 BCE)
Dhar Tichitt Civilization (1600–300 BCE)
Nok Civilization (1000 BCE–300 CE)
Kingdom of Ife (200 BCE-1914 CE)
Djenné-Djenno Civilization (250 BCE–900 CE)
Bura Civilization (300–1300 CE)
Ghana Empire (300–1240 CE)

Post-classical

Kingdom of Ife (200 BCE-1914 CE)
Ghana Empire (300–1240 CE)
Kingdom of Nri (948–1911 CE)
Takrur (800s–13th century CE)
Bonoman (11th–19th century CE)
Mossi Kingdoms (11th century–1896 CE)
Benin Empire (1180–1897 CE)
Kingdom of Ardra (12th/13th century–present)
Mali Empire (1235–1600 CE)
Oyo Empire  (1300-1898 CE)
Akpakip Oro (1200-1909 CE)
Jolof Empire (1350–1549 CE)
Wolof Empire (1350–1889 CE)
Bornu Empire (1380–1893 CE)
Kingdom of Dagbon (1409–Ce?)
Sultanate of Agadez (1449-1900 CE)
Kingdom of Sine (14th–19th century CE)
Songhai Empire (1464–1591 CE)
Empire of Great Fulo (1490–1776 CE)
Kingdom of Saloum (1494–1969 CE)

Modern

Kingdom of Dagbon (11th Century-Present)
Mamprussi (16th century CE–?)
Kwararafa Confederacy (1500-1840 CE)
Kaabu Empire (1537–1867 CE)
Kingdom of Cayor (1549–1879 CE)
Kingdom of Jolof (1549-1875)
Kingdom of Baol (1555–1874 CE)
Kingdom of Whydah (1580–1727 CE)
Kingdom of Dahomey (1600–1900 CE) 
Asante Union (1670–Present)
Aro Confederacy (1690–1902 CE)
Wémè Kingdom (17th century CE—?)
Hogbonu Kingdom (17th century CE—?)
Gbokpoe dynasty (1700-1940 CE)
Kong Empire (1710–1894 CE)  
Bamana Empire (1712–1861 CE)
Sokoto Caliphate (1804–1904 CE)
Wukari Federation (1840-1900 CE)
Wassoulou Empire (1878–1898 CE)

Central Africa

Ancient
Sao Civilization (6th century BCE–16th century CE)

Post-classical
Kanem–Bornu Empire (9th century–1900 CE)
Kingdom of Kongo (1390–1914 CE)

Modern
Sultanate of Bagirmi (1522–1897 CE)
Luba Empire (1585–1885 CE) 
Kingdom of Ndongo (16th century–? CE)
Anziku Kingdom (?-19th century)
Kasanje Kingdom (1620-1910 CE)
Kingdom of Matamba (1631–1744 CE)
Wadai Empire (1635–1912 CE)
Lunda Empire (1660–1887 CE) 
Kingdom of Lunda (1665–1887 CE)
Kuba Kingdom (1625–present CE)
Bailundo (1700-present CE)
Mbunda Kingdom (1700-1914 CE)
Viye (1700-present)
Adamawa Emirate (1809-1903 CE)
Yeke Kingdom (1856-1891CE)

Southern Africa

Post-classical
Kingdom of Mapungubwe (9th century–14th century CE)
Kingdom of Zimbabwe (900 –1450 CE)
Kingdom of Mutapa (1430–1760 CE)
Kingdom of Butua (1450–1683 CE)
Torwa dynasty (1450–1683 CE)
Kingdom of Maravi (1480-1891)

Modern
Merina Kingdom (1540–1897 CE)
Rozwi Empire (1660–1866 CE)
Ndwandwe Kingdom (1780–1819 CE)
Xhosa Kingdom (13th century-1879 CE)
Mthethwa Paramountcy Godongwane Jobe  (18th century–1820 CE)
Zulu Kingdom Senzangakhona, Shaka, Dingana, Mpande, Cetshwayo  (1816–1897 CE)
Kingdom of Mthwakazi (1823-1894)

See also
 African empires
 List of current non-sovereign African monarchs
 List of Nigerian traditional states
 Monarchies in Africa

References

Sources

J. Vansina, A Comparison of African Kingdoms, Africa: Journal of the International African Institute (1962), pp. 324–335.
Turchin, Peter and Jonathan M. Adams and Thomas D. Hall: "East-West Orientation of Historical Empires and Modern States", Journal of World-Systems Research, Vol. XII, No. II, 2006

External links
 Haffenreffer Museum of Anthropology

 
 Pre-colonial
 Pre-colonial
Africa
Africa-related lists
Africa
Africa